Richard Gilhooly (born 26 March 1979) is a New Zealand cricketer. He played in one first-class match for Wellington in 2005.

See also
 List of Wellington representative cricketers

References

External links
 

1979 births
Living people
New Zealand cricketers
Wellington cricketers
Cricketers from Hastings, New Zealand